Sunniside is a common name for villages in historic County Durham:

Sunniside, Gateshead
Sunniside, Sunderland
Sunniside, Weardale